The Bletchley Circle: San Francisco is a British-Canadian television drama series that premiered in the United Kingdom on ITV on 25 July 2018, in the United States on BritBox on 26 July 2018, and in Canada on Citytv on 14 September 2018.

A spin-off of the miniseries The Bletchley Circle, the new series follows Millie (Rachael Stirling) and Jean (Julie Graham) as they travel to San Francisco and continue to use their code-breaking skills to solve murders.

The Bletchley Circle: San Francisco is produced by Omnifilm Entertainment and World Productions for BritBox, with Kew Media as the international distributor. Filming began in March 2018 and takes place principally in Vancouver, British Columbia.

Following a successful debut season, Rachael Stirling and Julie Graham confirmed during an interview with Total TV Guide in April 2019 that a second series had been commissioned.  The complete first series was released on DVD in Region 2 by Acorn Media on 20 May 2019.

Cast and characters

Main
 Julie Graham as Jean McBrian
 Rachael Stirling as Camilla 'Millie' Harcourt
 Crystal Balint as Iris Bearden
 Chanelle Peloso as Hailey Yarner

Recurring
 Ben Cotton as Detective Bill Bryce
 Jennifer Spence as Olivia Mori
 Peter Benson as Archie Hunter
 Colin Lawrence as Marcus Bearden
 Agape Mngomezulu as Dennis Bearden
 Aria Birch as Cadence Bearden 
 Luke Camilleri as Edward Harcourt

Episodes

Series 1 (2018)

Reception
On review aggregator website Rotten Tomatoes the series has a 31% approval rating. The critical consensus states:  "The Bletchley Circle does not fare well when it relocates to San Francisco, unable to convincingly capture its period setting and hobbled by an outlandish murder mystery that fails to enthrall."

In the review for The Times, Carol Midgley said the series seemed "to have been conceived primarily to feed viewer appetite for lush 1950s visuals, with plot and dialogue coming second." In the Los Angeles Times, however,  Lorraine Ali wrote: "Though this round of sleuthing isn’t as full of surprises as the series set in the U.K., it does effectively play with a different set of era-specific hurdles unique to the U.S....“The Bletchley Circle: San Francisco” isn’t as rich and meaningful as its predecessor, but it’s evocative and entertaining, with a little murder thrown in for good measure."

References

External links
 
 The Bletchley Circle: San Francisco at World Productions
  The Bletchley Circle: San Francisco at BritBox
 

2018 British television series debuts
2018 Canadian television series debuts
2018 British television series endings
2018 Canadian television series endings
2010s British crime drama television series
2010s British LGBT-related drama television series
2010s Canadian crime drama television series
2010s Canadian LGBT-related drama television series
English-language television shows
Lesbian-related television shows
Television shows set in San Francisco
Television shows filmed in Vancouver
Citytv original programming
ITV television dramas
Television series by ITV Studios
Television series by World Productions